The Northumberland and Durham Coalfield is a coalfield in North East England, otherwise known as the Durham and Northumberland Coalfield or the Great Northern Coalfield. It consists of the Northumberland Coalfield and the Durham Coalfield.

Coal mining regions in England
Geography of Northumberland
Geography of County Durham
Mining in County Durham
Geology of England
Mining in Northumberland
Geology of Northumberland
Geology of County Durham